Below is a list of notable people born in Gostivar, North Macedonia or its surroundings:

Historical figures 
Petar Novaković Čardaklija, diplomat in the First Serbian Uprising
Xhem Hasa, nationalist and member of the Balli Kombëtar
Voisava Tripalda, mother of Skanderbeg

Sports figures  
Amir Bilali, football player 
Argjend Beqiri, football player
Rudi Gusnić, football manager and former player
Shaban Ismaili, footballer
Shkodran Mustafi, footballer
Admir Mehmedi, football player
Nazmi Mehmeti, wrestler
Gentjana Rochi, football player 
Nuri Seferi, boxer, reigning WBO European Cruiserweight Champion
Nezbedin Selimi, footballer

Academics  
Ferid Murad,  is a physician and pharmacologist, and a co-winner of the 1998 Nobel Prize in Physiology or Medicine.
Haralampije Polenaković, literary historian
Jovan Trifunovski, Serbian geographer
Semih Ali, Turkish Economist and Businessman
Fadil Hoca, Turkish Literature Professor

Artist  
Burhan Ahmeti, Artist
Mladen Srbinović, Serbian painter 
Elyesa Kaso, Turkish Macedonian actor.
Atilla Klinçe, Turkish Macedonian actor, director of Turkish Theatre in Skopje.
İkay Yusuf, Turkish Macedonian Rock musician and Radio DJ.
Yusuf Sabit, Turkish Macedonian writer and poet.
Haris Murić, Bosniak Macedonian graphic designer.
Nuri Karaca, Turkish Macedonian musician and vocalist.
Xhezair Rexhepi, Albanian Artist Sculptor

Politicians  
Hadi Nezir, Turkish Macedonian ex-state minister.
Furkan Çako, Turkish Macedonian state minister.
Arben Taravari, Albanian Macedonian doctor and mayor of Gostivar.

References

Gostivar
List